Micronations are ephemeral, self-proclaimed entities that claim to be independent sovereign states, but which are not acknowledged as such by any recognised sovereign state, or by any supranational organisation. The constant reiteration of the flag as a symbol of a something that exists by the entity that it symbolises confirms the validity of the flag as an officially sanctioned and/or definitive symbol of an entity; therefore, there has been a close association between vexillology/vexillogic imagination in creating visual symbols that appear to legitimise micronational claims.

This article documents the designated national flags of micronations whose existence is verifiable in multiple, non-trivial third party reference sources, which have been cited in the linked encyclopedia articles for those entities.

A

B

C

E

F

G

H

I

J

K

L

M

N

O

P

R

S

T

V

W

See also
 Ethnic flag
 Flags of active autonomist and secessionist movements
 Flags of country subdivisions, such as U.S. states
 Gallery of flags of dependent territories, such as British overseas territories
 Lists of city flags
 List of former sovereign states
 List of micronations

References

External links
 

 Micronations